Roger Lee Vernon (born 1924) is an American science fiction writer.

He received a Master's degree from Northwestern University, traveled extensively throughout North American and Europe, and while writing his stories in the early 1950s worked as a Chicago high school teacher.  In 1968 he received his PhD in history, also from Northwestern University, and afterward taught at colleges in the Chicago area and aboard US Navy ships.  Retired, he lives in Elgin, Illinois with his wife, where he has returned to writing.  He and his wife have four children.

Works
 The Space Frontiers (1955) - short story collection, published by Signet Books (Library of Congress catalog card 55-10447)
 Robot Hunt (1959) - novel
 The Fall of the American Empire - 2013: A Remembrance of Things Future (2010) - novel, published by BookSurge.
 If (2011) - short story collection, published by iUniverse.

References

External links
 Roger Lee Vernon bibliography / "The Space Frontiers" cover page, on Fantastic Fiction
 Roger Lee Vernon in "Retro Future: To The Stars!" (Part 3)
 Roger Lee Vernon's blog

1924 births
1980 deaths
20th-century American novelists
American male novelists
American science fiction writers
Northwestern University alumni
American male short story writers
20th-century American short story writers
20th-century American male writers